The Tyssedal Power Station  (Tyssedal kraftanlegg) is a hydroelectric power station and museum located in Tyssedal in the municipality Odda in Vestland, Norway. The station was designed by architect Thorvald Astrup. The plant was protected by the Norwegian Directorate for Cultural Heritage in 2000, and is part of the Norwegian Museum of Hydropower and Industry. The power station was added to the list of priority technical and industrial cultural heritage by the Norwegian Directorate for Cultural Heritage.

It is an anchor point of the European Route of Industrial Heritage (ERIH).

See also

References 

Hydroelectric power stations in Norway
Buildings and structures in Vestland
European Route of Industrial Heritage Anchor Points
Odda